Kamøyvær is a fishing village in Nordkapp Municipality in Troms og Finnmark county, Norway. It sits at the end of a cul-de-sac road, the Norwegian County Road 172.

The village is sheltered from the open sea by the islands of Lille Kamøya and Store Kamøya, the water between the village and the latter being called the Østersundet.

There are around 70 inhabitants in the village. Although there are no ethnic distinctions today, the people of the village are descended from coastal Sami and Kven as well as Norwegians. In the summer of 2012, the labour force in the village included people from the Baltic states.

A small hotel/guesthouse called the Arran, owned by a Sami family, occupies three blue-painted buildings in the centre of the village.  One of them is right on the waters of the harbour and the other two are just across the road. The top floor of a house in the centre of the village contains an art gallery called the Gallery East of the Sun which displays and sells the work of a German-born artist, Eva Schmutterer, who lives in the village.

Hjalmarneset peninsula
There is a small lighthouse, the Kamøyfjord light, on the hill on the Hjalmarneset peninsula at the north side of the village.
There is also a small cemetery on the western side of this peninsula.

Kuvika
At Kuvika, a hamlet at the southern entrance to the village, there is a small fish processing plant on the side of the Risfjorden; this is supplied by the boats that use the harbour in the middle of the village.

Media gallery

References

Villages in Finnmark
Fishing communities in Norway
Nordkapp
Magerøya